Ely Warner (May 24, 1785 – October 23, 1872) was an American lawyer, politician, and jurist.

Warner, son of Jonathan and Hephzibah (Ely) Warner, was born in Chester (then a parish in Saybrook), Conn., May 24, 1785.

He graduated from Yale College in 1807. After graduation, he taught school for a year or more, and then entered the Law School at Litchfield, Conn., and was admitted to the bar at Middletown about 1811. So untiring was his industry while pursuing his professional studies, that he wrote from his own stenographic notes the entire course of lectures, making three manuscript volumes, said to be the only correct copy of the lectures of Judges Reeve and Gould now extant.  Settling in Haddam in 1816, he afterwards represented that town in the Connecticut State Legislature tor two sessions, in 1825 and 1831.  In 1828 he was appointed chief judge of the Middlesex County Court, and was re-appointed for several terms. Subsequently he became cashier of the East Haddam Bank, but removed to Chester in 1837, where his farm was situated, and where he resided during the remainder of his life. In 1855 he was appointed county commissioner, and held office for two terms. He was also for more than fifty years actively engaged as county surveyor. He died of paralysis, at his residence in Chester, October 23, 1872, in his 88th year, being at that time the oldest lawyer in the State.

Judge Warner was married, November 11, 1817, to Sarah H., eldest daughter of John Warner, of Chester, who survived him.  Of their eight children, three sons and three daughters survived him. One son, Jared C. Warner, graduated Yale in 1854, and died August 9, 1855, in East Saginaw, Michigan, where he was engaged in teaching.

External links

 Litchfield Ledger

1785 births
1872 deaths
Yale College alumni
Litchfield Law School alumni
Connecticut lawyers
Members of the Connecticut General Assembly
People from Chester, Connecticut
19th-century American politicians
Politicians from Saginaw, Michigan
19th-century American lawyers